Gun Crazy (also known as Deadly Is the Female) is a 1950 American crime film noir starring Peggy Cummins and John Dall in a story about the crime-spree of a gun-toting husband and wife.  It was directed by Joseph H. Lewis, and produced by Frank and Maurice King.

The screenplay by blacklisted writer Dalton Trumbo—credited to Millard Kaufman because of the blacklist—and by MacKinlay Kantor was based upon a short story by Kantor published in 1940 in The Saturday Evening Post. In 1998, Gun Crazy was selected for preservation in the United States National Film Registry by the Library of Congress as being "culturally, historically, or aesthetically significant."

Plot
Teenager Barton "Bart" Tare gets caught breaking a hardware store window to steal a gun. He is sent to reform school for four years despite the supportive testimony of his friends Dave and Clyde, his older sister Ruby and others. They claim he would never kill any living creature, even though he has had a fascination with guns even as a child. Flashbacks provide a portrait of Bart who, after killing a young chick with a BB gun at age seven, is hesitant to shoot at anything, even a mountain lion with a bounty on its head. However, he is a dead shot with a handgun.

After reform school and a stint in the Army teaching marksmanship, Bart returns home. He, Dave, and Clyde go to a traveling carnival in town. Once there, Bart challenges sharpshooter Annie Laurie Starr ("Laurie") to a contest and wins. She gets him a job with the carnival and he becomes smitten with her. Their mutual attraction inflames the jealousy of their boss, Packett, who wants her for himself. When Packett tries to force himself on her, Bart fires a warning shot within an inch of his nose. Packet fires the couple, who leave together. Before they marry, Laurie warns Bart that she is "bad, but will try to be good". They embark on a carefree honeymoon on Bart’s savings. When the money runs out, though, she gives Bart a stark choice: join her in a career of crime or she will leave him. They hold up stores and gas stations, but the paltry take does not last long.

While fleeing a police car Laurie tells Bart to shoot at the driver so they can escape, but he hesitates and becomes disoriented. Ultimately, he shoots the tire out and the car crashes. Later that day, at another robbery, Laurie intends to shoot and kill a grocer, but Bart stops her in time. The couple have now been identified in national newspapers as notorious robbers.

Bart says he is done with a life of crime. Laurie persuades him to take on one last big robbery so they can flee the country and live in peace and comfort. They get jobs at a meat processing plant and make detailed plans. When they hold up the payroll department, the office manager pulls the burglar alarm and Laurie shoots her dead. While fleeing the plant, Laurie also kills a security guard. Bart does not realize at the time that both victims are dead, but learns about it later from a newspaper. Laurie then discloses she shot a man dead in St. Louis while she and Packett were attempting a hold-up. She claims that those murders happen because the fear makes her unable to think straight in the moment.

To minimize the chances of being caught, the two decide to split up for a couple of months, but neither can bear to be away from the other. The FBI is brought in, and the fugitives become the targets of an intense manhunt.

In California, Bart arranges for passage to Mexico, when the FBI finds them in a dance hall. Forced to flee, they leave all their loot behind. With roadblocks everywhere, they jump on a train and get off near Ruby's house. Clyde, then the local sheriff, notices that the house has the curtains drawn and the children are not in school. He informs Dave, and the two plead with Bart to give himself and Laurie up. Instead, the couple flee into the mountains. Pursued by police dogs, they are surrounded in reed grass the next morning. In dense fog, Dave and Clyde approach to try to reason with them. As soon as Bart sees Laurie preparing to gun them down, he shoots her and is, in turn, killed by the police.

Cast

 Peggy Cummins as Annie Laurie Starr
 John Dall as Barton "Bart" Tare
 Berry Kroeger as Packett
 Morris Carnovsky as Judge Willoughby
 Anabel Shaw as Ruby Tare Flagler
 Harry Lewis as Deputy Clyde Boston
 Nedrick Young as Dave Allister
 Trevor Bardette as Sheriff Boston, who apprehends the teenage Bart
 Mickey Little as Bart Tare at age 7
 Rusty Tamblyn as Bart Tare at age 14
 Paul Frison as Clyde Boston at age 14
 David Bair as Dave Allister at age 7
 Stanley Prager as Bluey-Bluey
 Virginia Farmer as Miss Wynn
 Anne O'Neal as Miss Augustine Sifert  (office manager shot dead by Laurie)
 Frances Irvin as Danceland singer
Robert Osterloh as Hampton Policeman
 Shimen Ruskin as Cab Driver
 Harry Hayden as Mr. Mallenberg, the plant manager

Production
The screenplay was credited to Kantor and Millard Kaufman; however, Kaufman was a front for Hollywood Ten outcast Dalton Trumbo, who considerably reworked the story into a doomed love affair.

The picture originally was slated to be released by Monogram Studios. However, King Brothers Productions, the producers, chose United Artists as the distributor. Gun Crazy enjoyed wider exposure because it was a United Artists release.

The King Brothers originally announced they wanted Veronica Lake for the lead.

In an interview with Danny Peary, director Joseph H. Lewis revealed his instructions to actors John Dall and Peggy Cummins: 
I told John, "Your cock's never been so hard", and I told Peggy, "You're a female dog in heat, and you want him. But don't let him have it in a hurry. Keep him waiting." That's exactly how I talked to them and I turned them loose. I didn't have to give them more directions.

The bank heist sequence was shot entirely in one long take in Montrose, California, with no one besides the principal actors and people inside the bank alerted to the operation. This one-take shot includes the sequence of driving into town to the bank, distracting and then knocking out a patrolman, and making the get-away. This was done by simulating the interior of a sedan with a stretch Cadillac with room enough to mount the camera and a jockey's saddle for the cameraman on a greased two-by-twelve board in the back. Lewis kept the onscreen conversations fresh by having the actors improvise their dialogue.

Reception

Critical response
In his 1998 book Dark City: The Lost World of Film Noir, critic and film historian Eddie Muller commends the production. "Joseph H. Lewis's direction", he notes, "is propulsive, possessed of a confident, vigorous simplicity that all the frantic editing and visual pyrotechnics of the filmmaking progeny never quite surpassed."

Sam Adams, media critic for the Philadelphia City Paper, wrote in 2008: "The codes of the time prevented Lewis from being explicit about the extent to which their fast-blooming romance is fueled by their mutual love of weaponry (Arthur Penn would rip off the covers in Bonnie and Clyde, which owes Gun Crazy a substantial debt), but when Cummins' six-gun dangles provocatively as she gasses up their jalopy, it's clear what really fills their collective tank."

The review-aggregation website Rotten Tomatoes reports that 91% of film critics gave the production a positive rating, one based on 64 reviews.

Recognition
In 1998, Gun Crazy was selected for preservation in the United States National Film Registry by the Library of Congress as being "culturally, historically, or aesthetically significant."

American Film Institute Lists 
 AFI's 100 Years...100 Movies – Nominated
 AFI's 100 Years...100 Thrills – Nominated
 AFI's 100 Years...100 Thrills - Nominated
 AFI's 100 Years...100 Movie Quotes:
 "We go together, Laurie. I don't know why. Maybe like guns and ammunition go together." – Nominated
 AFI's 10 Top 10 – Nominated Gangster Film

References

External links

 Gun Crazy  by Richard T. Jameson on the National Film Registry website
 Gun Crazy essay by Daniel Eagan in America's Film Legacy: The Authoritative Guide to the Landmark Movies in the National Film Registry, A&C Black, 2010 , pages 432-433

 
 
 
 Gun Crazy at Film Site
 Gun Crazy at 10 Shades of Noir
 Gun Crazy title film clip at Veoh
  (the bank heist scene)

1950 films
1950s crime thriller films
American crime thriller films
American heist films
American black-and-white films
1950s English-language films
Film noir
Films based on short fiction
Films based on works by MacKinlay Kantor
Films directed by Joseph H. Lewis
Films scored by Victor Young
Films with screenplays by Dalton Trumbo
United Artists films
United States National Film Registry films
Uxoricide in fiction
1950s American films